Sar Sakhti or Sarsakhti may refer to:
 Sar Sakhti-ye Bala
 Sar Sakhti-ye Pain